Karl Eric Goddard (born 29 December 1967) is an English retired footballer who played for Manchester United, Bradford City, Exeter City (on loan), Colchester United (on loan), Hereford United and Bradford Park Avenue.

References

1967 births
Living people
Footballers from Leeds
English footballers
Association football defenders
Manchester United F.C. players
Bradford City A.F.C. players
Exeter City F.C. players
Colchester United F.C. players
Hereford United F.C. players
Bradford (Park Avenue) A.F.C. players
English Football League players